Larocheidae is a family of small to minute sea snails, marine gastropod molluscs or micromolluscs in the superfamily Scissurelloidea.

Genera
The family Larocheidae contains the following genera:
 Bathyxylophila B. A. Marshall, 1988
 Larochea Finlay, 1927
 Larocheopsis B.A. Marshall, 1993
 Trogloconcha Kase & Kano, 2002

References

 Bouchet P. & Rocroi J.-P. (2005) Classification and nomenclator of gastropod families. Malacologia 47(1-2): 1-397.
 Geiger D.L. (2012) Monograph of the little slit shells. Volume 1. Introduction, Scissurellidae. pp. 1-728. Volume 2. Anatomidae, Larocheidae, Depressizonidae, Sutilizonidae, Temnocinclidae. pp. 729–1291. Santa Barbara Museum of Natural History Monographs Number 7